Ishq Garaari is a Punjabi film directed by Dheeraj Rattan. It is produced by Ravi Jain and Karan Bali and stars Sharry Mann, Rannvijay Singh, Mandy Takhar, Gulzar Chahal, Miss Pooja, Vinaypal Buttar, Gunjan Walia, and Prabhleen Sandhu. The film also has a song titled 'Khalaara' by Yo Yo Honey Singh.

Plot
The story is about Sharry who loves Priti and wants to marry her but her father who is doing tempo business is against it. Sharry aspires to become a singer. Later, her father puts forth a condition to Sharry wherein he has to arrange INR 70 lakhs to win her hand in marriage. Sharry kidnaps a girl Sweety thinking her to be daughter of Makhan owner of tempo business and seeks INR 70 lacs as ransom but discovers that they have kidnapped the wrong girl. Then there is a parallel story of Priti and Sweety who are daughters of tempo owner.

Cast
 Sharry Mann
 Mandy Takhar
 Gulzar Chahal
 Rannvijay Singh
 Vinaypal Buttar
 Miss Pooja
 Mukesh Vohra
 Gunjan Walia
 Prabhleen Sandhu

Reception
One of the critics says, "Ishq Garaari is a film with a story which has never been attempted before in Punjabi cinema. The best thing about Ishq Garaari is that it doesn't stick to the formula and yet sparkles romance, humour and crackling chemistry between its lead actors."

References

External links 
 
 "Ishq Garaari Official Facebook Page"

2013 films
Indian romantic comedy films
2013 romantic comedy films
Punjabi-language Indian films
2010s Punjabi-language films